The Carracci were a family of Italian artists. Notable members include:

 Agostino Carracci (1557–1602), Italian painter and printmaker
 Annibale Carracci (1560–1609), Italian Baroque painter and brother of Agostino Carracci
 Ludovico Carracci (1555–1619), Italian painter, etcher, printmaker, and cousin of Agostino and Annibale Carracci
 Antonio Marziale Carracci (1583–1618), Italian painter and son of Agostino Carracci
 Francesco Carracci (1595–1622), Italian painter and engraver, nephew of Agostino Carracci
 Baldassare Aloisi (1578–1638), painter and engraver whose mother, Elena Zenzanini, was a cousin of Agostino and Annibale Carracci
 Giovanni Francesco Grimaldi (1606–1680), painter, whose common law wife was Aloisi's daughter

See also
 Accademia dei Carracci, a Bolognese art academy founded by the family
 The Carracci, the three cousins Agostino, Annibale and Lodovico Carracci

Italian families